Goldasht is a village in Salehan Rural District, in the Central District of Khomeyn County, Markazi Province, Iran. At the 2006 census, its population was 1,971, with 575 families.

References 

Populated places in Khomeyn County